is a Japanese variety show airing on TV Tokyo since 2 April 2018.

Members
Ayane Konuma

Discography
Their single, was released on 22 January 2020 and charted at #7 on the Oricon Singles Chart on 3 February.

References

External links
  
 Seishun Kōkō 3-nen C-gumi on TV Tokyo website
 Seishun Kōkō 3-nen C-gumi on Universal Music Japan website 
 Seishun Kōkō 3-nen C-gumi on LINE LIVE 

2018 Japanese television series debuts
Japanese variety television shows
Yasushi Akimoto